The Stade Émile-Stahl is a stadium located in the municipality of Strasbourg in France. With a capacity of 3,000 places (of which 600 places are in the grandstand), its resident club is ASPV Strasbourg. It is the second largest football stadium in the city after the Stade de la Meinau.

History  
The stadium was built around 1920. ASPV Strasbourg settled there during World War II. Formerly called the Stade de la Porte de Kehl, on 22 August 2009, it was renamed to the Stade Émile-Stahl in honor of a former officer of the resident club. This name change was inaugurated by the Mayor of Strasbourg, Roland Ries, accompanied by the club president and other personalities.

References

External links 
 WebPage on the stadium on fr.soccerway.com   
   Subject of the st aduyn on www.info-stades.fr

Sports venues completed in 1920
Football venues in France
Sports venues in Strasbourg